Podborek  is a village in the administrative district of Gmina Rytwiany, within Staszów County, Świętokrzyskie Voivodeship, in south-central Poland.

The village has a population of  174.

Demography 
According to the 2002 Poland census, there were 145 people residing in Podborek village, of whom 49% were male and 51% were female. In the village, the population was spread out, with 26.9% under the age of 18, 34.5% from 18 to 44, 20.7% from 45 to 64, and 17.9% who were 65 years of age or older.
 Figure 1. Population pyramid of village in 2002 — by age group and sex

References

Podborek